John T. Standley (born April 20, 1964) is an American businessman. He became the corporate president of Walgreens .

Born in 1964, Standley received a Bachelor of Science from Pepperdine University.

Standley served as chief executive officer and board member of Pathmark Stores, Inc. and held executive financial positions at several other grocery and retail companies.  A former Chair of the National Association of Chain Drug Stores (NACDS) and board member of CarMax, Inc. and Supervalu, Inc, Standley served as chairman and CEO of Rite Aid Corporation until being replaced as CEO on August 8, 2019, by Heyward Donigan, whereafter he joined Walgreens Boots Alliance.

References

1964 births
Living people